The Yankee Doodle Mouse is a 1943 American one-reel animated cartoon in Technicolor. It is the eleventh Tom and Jerry short produced by Fred Quimby, and directed by William Hanna and Joseph Barbera, with musical supervision by Scott Bradley and animation by Irven Spence, Pete Burness, Kenneth Muse and George Gordon. Jack Zander was credited on the original print, but his credit was omitted in the 1950 reissue. It was released to theaters on June 26, 1943 by Metro-Goldwyn Mayer.
The short features Tom the cat and Jerry the mouse chasing each other in a pseudo-warfare style, and makes numerous references to World War II technology such as jeeps and dive bombers, represented by clever uses of common household items. The Yankee Doodle Mouse won the 1943 Oscar for Best Animated Short Film, making it the first of seven Tom and Jerry cartoons to receive this distinction.

This is the first Tom and Jerry short to be animated by Ray Patterson, who arrived from Screen Gems. Patterson would continue to work for Hanna and Barbera until the 1980s.

Crew
Directed by: William Hanna and Joseph Barbera
Story: William Hanna, Joseph Barbera
Animation: Irven Spence, Pete Burness, George Gordon, Kenneth Muse
Additional Animation: Jack Zander, Ray Patterson
Assistant Animation: Barney Posner
Effects Animation: Al Grandmain, Stan Quackenbush
Layout: Harvey Eisenberg
Music: Scott Bradley
Co-Producer: William Hanna
Produced by: Fred Quimby

Missing sequence
The short was reissued in 1950. A gag involving ration stamps was removed in the reissue print. In the sequence where Jerry hits Tom with a board four times, as Jerry attempts to run off, the sequence fades to black. In the original missing sequence, Tom follows him, only to get his head stuck in Jerry’s hole. Jerry then uses Tom’s tongue to lick a war bond stamp. The second war communique reads: "Enemy gets in a few good licks! Signed, Lt. Jerry Mouse".

Availability
VHS
Tom & Jerry's 50th Birthday Classics
Laserdisc
Tom & Jerry Classics
The Art of Tom & Jerry Vol. 1, Side 2
DVD
Tom and Jerry Spotlight Collection Vol. 1, Disc 1
Tom and Jerry: The Deluxe Anniversary Collection Disc 1
Tom and Jerry Golden Collection Vol. 1, Disc 1
Blu-ray
Tom and Jerry Golden Collection Vol. 1, Disc 1

References

External links

1943 films
1943 animated films
1943 short films
1940s American animated films
1940s animated short films
1943 comedy films
American World War II propaganda shorts
Best Animated Short Academy Award winners
Short films directed by Joseph Barbera
Short films directed by William Hanna
Metro-Goldwyn-Mayer animated short films
Tom and Jerry short films
Films scored by Scott Bradley
Films without speech
Films produced by Fred Quimby
Metro-Goldwyn-Mayer cartoon studio short films
Animated films without speech